"Seongho" Yi Ik (1681–1763) was a Korean Neo-Confucian scholar, early Silhak philosopher and social critic.  He was born to a yangban family of the Yeoju Yi clan. His one disciple of Yi Seo-woo, was Misu Heo Mok and Baikho Yun Hyu's school disciples. second cousin of Yu Hyeong-won. Like most in his position, he studied for the gwageo in order to gain a position of rank; but failed in his first attempt in 1705.  Shortly thereafter, his elder brother Yi Jam was beaten to death as part of the Lady Jang incident, and Yi lost interest in government service.

Yi Ik followed in Yu Hyeong-won line of thought extending in this work Seongho Saseol, which covers subjects as government, economy, and the family, and makes detailed proposals for reordering each aspect of Joseon society.  His most famous work was Record of Concern for the Underprivileged which lays down the cardinal principles of reform ideas.  As Yi attracted many disciples, Silhak gradually emerged as Joseon dynasty's dominant school of thought.

He was born in Ansan in 1681. In 1967 a monument to him, "Tomb of Yi Ik" was erect there, next to a museum celebrating his life and works.

Work book 
 Seonghosaseol (성호사설, 星湖僿說)
 SeonghoMunjip (성호문집, 星湖文集)
 Yijasueo (이자수어, 李子粹語)
 Seonghojilseo (성호질서, 星湖疾書)
 Kwakwurock (곽우록, 藿憂錄)

See also
Korean Confucianism
Korean philosophy
List of Korean philosophers

External links

Bibliography

1681 births
1763 deaths
18th-century Korean philosophers
Korean Confucianists
18th-century Korean poets
Neo-Confucian scholars
18th-century agronomists
People from Ansan